Cedar Point, also known as the Richard Gwyn House and Richard Gwyn Franklin House, is a historic home located at Elkin, Surry County, North Carolina. It was built about 1840, and is a two-story, three bay, Greek Revival style frame I-house.  It has a two-story rear ell and rests on a brick pier foundation.  It features a one-story, hip-roofed front porch with overhanging boxed eaves.  It was built by Richard Gwyn (1796-1881), known as "Elkin's Founding Father."

It was listed on the National Register of Historic Places in 2003.

There is also an interesting Indian rock located in the front yard (which can be seen from the road) which still contains an attached carved bowl. Date unknown.

References

Houses on the National Register of Historic Places in North Carolina
Greek Revival houses in North Carolina
Houses completed in 1840
Houses in Surry County, North Carolina
National Register of Historic Places in Surry County, North Carolina
1840s establishments in North Carolina